Georgia Street Historic District is a national historic district located at Louisiana, Pike County, Missouri.  The district encompasses 55 contributing buildings in the central business district of Louisiana.  It developed between about 1845 and 1935, and includes representative examples of Greek Revival, Italianate, and Classical Revival style architecture. Notable buildings include the Masonic Temple (1910), Odd Fellows lodge (1890), and Post Office (1905).

It was listed on the National Register of Historic Places in 1987.

References

Geography of Pike County, Missouri
Historic districts on the National Register of Historic Places in Missouri
Greek Revival architecture in Missouri
Neoclassical architecture in Missouri
Italianate architecture in Missouri
Buildings and structures in Pike County, Missouri
National Register of Historic Places in Pike County, Missouri